Blue Moon  is the debut studio album by the doo-wop group The Marcels. It was released in 1961 on Colpix Records and included 12 songs. The album was available in mono, catalogue number CP-416. Blue Moon was produced and arranged by Stu Phillips and recorded in New York at RCA Studios. Blue Moon features a cover version of the Judy Garland hit "Over the Rainbow". Four decades after the group's debut album was released, the Marcels were inducted into the Vocal Group Hall of Fame.

Reception
Although the album Blue Moon failed to chart on the Billboard albums chart, the first single "Blue Moon" did well. The single charted at No. 1 on the Billboard Hot 100 for three weeks, charted at No. 1 on the UK Singles Chart, sold one million copies and the group was awarded a gold disc.

Track listing

Side one

Side two

References

1961 debut albums
The Marcels albums
Colpix Records albums